Kadyr Gafurovich Gulamov (Қодир Ғуломов, ; born February 17, 1945) is an Uzbek politician who has served as Minister of Defence of Uzbekistan. To date, he was the first and only civilian leader of an Uzbek military department.

Biography

He was born in Tashkent in February 1945. He is the son of the Soviet-Uzbek poet Gʻafur Gʻulom. In 1963 he began his studies at Tashkent State University before being sent to the Academy of Sciences of Uzbekistan in 1968. In the 30 years that followed, he worked as an official in the academy, becoming the Chief Scientific Secretary in 1999. He held his first government position that same year, when he was appointed Deputy Minister of Defense and Rector of the Academy of the Armed Forces of Uzbekistan. In May 1999, he was drafted into the Uzbek military and by presidential decree he was promoted to the rank of colonel. He became the first civilian minister of defense of the country in 2000, as well as concurrently State Advisor to the President Islam Karimov. He was dismissed from this post in 2005, and has been leading researcher of the Physics-Sun Association since 2006. On 15 November 2005, three days before his dismissal, the European Union issued a list of 12 top Uzbek officials who were banned from visiting EU member states for a year, a list which included Gulyamov among others. It was issued in response to the putting down of protests in Andijan that May.

Work as defense minister 
Is appointment was part of plans to "establish civilian control over military structures within the state", according to the National Security Council Secretary. Under his leadership, the defence ministry played a more administrative role, army commanders took charge of military operations. He founded the Center for Simulation and Modeling of the Armed Forces in 2004. He led Uzbek military cooperation with the United States following the September 11 attacks and the start of Global War On Terror.

Scientific activity 
In his scientific career, he performed a critical analysis of a number of theoretical approaches to the processes of particle production on nuclei. At the initiative of Gulyamov, the Institute of Materials Science of the Academy of Sciences of Uzbekistan was established in 1993, and in 1995, the Uzbek scientific and educational network UZSCINET was created. In 1997 and 2010, he made a proposal to organize an International Center for Solar Energy in Tashkent. He has over 300 scientific publications, most of which are published in international journals.

Awards 

 State Prize of the Uzbek SSR in the Field of Science and Technology named after Al-Biruni (1983)
 Medal of the Oliy Majlis "Mustakillik" (1992)
 Shon-Sharaf Order II degree (2003)

References 

1945 births
Living people
Scientists from Tashkent
Soviet scientists
Defence Ministers of Uzbekistan
Politicians from Tashkent